Anneliese Rockenbach (born 3 March 1943) is a Venezuelan swimmer. She competed at the 1960 Summer Olympics and the 1964 Summer Olympics.

References

1943 births
Living people
People from Mariánské Lázně
People from Sudetenland
Sudeten German people
Czechoslovak emigrants to Venezuela
Venezuelan people of German descent
Venezuelan female swimmers
Olympic swimmers of Venezuela
Swimmers at the 1960 Summer Olympics
Swimmers at the 1964 Summer Olympics